The 2002 Paddy Power World Grand Prix was the fifth staging of the World Grand Prix darts tournament, organised by the Professional Darts Corporation. It was held at the Citywest Hotel in Dublin, Ireland, between 22–27 October 2002.

Defending champion Alan Warriner lost in the first round to Ritchie Buckle. Phil Taylor defeated John Part 7–3 in the final to win his fourth Grand Prix title.

Prize money

Seeds

Draw

References

World Grand Prix (darts)
World Grand Prix Darts